Boratto is a surname. Notable people with the surname include:

 Caterina Boratto (1915–2010), Italian film actress
 Gui Boratto (born 1974), Brazilian electronic music producer